Rob Zombie (real name Robert Cummings) is an American heavy metal vocalist. In 1985 he formed the band White Zombie with guitarist Paul "Ena" Kostabi, bassist Sean Yseult and drummer Peter Landau. The group remained active until 1998, with its final lineup featuring Cummings and Yseult alongside guitarist Jay "J." Yuenger and drummer John Tempesta. In 1997, Zombie formed the first lineup of a solo band with Tempesta, guitarist Mike Riggs and bassist Rob "Blasko" Nicholson. The current lineup of Rob Zombie's band includes guitarist Mike Riggs, bassist Piggy D. (real name Matthew Montgomery) and drummer Ginger Fish (real name Kenneth Wilson).

History

White Zombie
White Zombie was formed in 1985 by vocalist Rob Zombie (then known as Rob Straker), guitarist Paul "Ena" Kostabi, bassist Sean Yseult and drummer Peter Landau, who recorded the group's debut EP Gods on Voodoo Moon that October. By early 1986, Kostabi and Landau had been replaced by Tim Jeffs and Ivan de Prume, respectively, for the recording of Pig Heaven/Slaughter the Grey and their first live performances. After touring for around a year, Jeffs was replaced by Tom Five (real name Tom Guay), who debuted on the band's third release Psycho-Head Blowout. The group released their debut full-length album Soul-Crusher at the end of 1987, touring until the following summer before Guay was replaced by John Ricci. With their new guitarist, White Zombie recorded their second album Make Them Die Slowly in November 1988. Ricci reportedly left on the last day of the album's recording, with Zombie claiming that "He didn't show up and nobody really cared." Make Them Die Slowly was released in February 1989.

Around the release of Make Them Die Slowly, Jay "J." Yuenger took over as White Zombie's guitarist. The new lineup issued the EP God of Thunder later in 1989, followed by third album La Sexorcisto: Devil Music Volume One in 1992, shortly after which de Prume left the band and was replaced by Phil Buerstatte. After contributing to the band's recordings of "I Am Hell" for The Beavis and Butt-Head Experience, "Children of the Grave" for Nativity in Black: A Tribute to Black Sabbath and "Feed the Gods" for the Airheads soundtrack, Buerstatte left White Zombie. He was replaced temporarily for a Japanese tour in May 1994 by Mark Poland. A few months later, former Exodus and Testament drummer John Tempesta took over permanently. White Zombie released its final album Astro-Creep: 2000 – Songs of Love, Destruction and Other Synthetic Delusions of the Electric Head in 1995. After a final tour which finished in August 1996, the group disbanded. However, the breakup was not made official until September 1998.

Rob Zombie
Rob Zombie began recording his debut solo album Hellbilly Deluxe in 1997, when White Zombie were technically still together. The core personnel for the recording included White Zombie drummer John Tempesta, plus guitarist Mike Riggs and bassist Rob "Blasko" Nicholson. This lineup remained intact for the 2001 follow-up The Sinister Urge, before Zombie took a break to focus on his filmmaking career, leading to the departures of Riggs and Tempesta who formed Scum of the Earth. In March 2005, Rob Zombie announced a new lineup featuring guitarist John 5 (real name John Lowery), bassist Blasko and drummer Tommy Clufetos. The new lineup released Educated Horses in March 2006, before Blasko left in May to join Ozzy Osbourne's band, replaced by Piggy D. (real name Matthew Montgomery).

In March 2010, after the release of Zombie's fourth solo album Hellbilly Deluxe 2, Clufetos was replaced by Slipknot drummer Joey Jordison after leaving to join Blasko in Ozzy Osbourne's band. During his short tenure with the band, Jordison recorded drums for three tracks released on the reissue of Hellbilly Deluxe 2 in September 2010. In February 2011, Jordison was replaced by outgoing Marilyn Manson drummer Ginger Fish (real name Kenneth Wilson). With this current lineup, Rob Zombie has released three more studio albums: Venomous Rat Regeneration Vendor in 2013, The Electric Warlock Acid Witch Satanic Orgy Celebration Dispenser in 2016 and The Lunar Injection Kool Aid Eclipse Conspiracy in 2021. In October 2022 it was announced that John 5 had left the band to become the touring guitarist for Mötley Crüe following the retirement of Mick Mars and that original guitarist Mike Riggs has returned.

Members

Current

Former

Timeline

Lineups

White Zombie

Rob Zombie

References

External links
White Zombie official website
Rob Zombie official website

Zombie, Rob